Faissal Futebol Clube, usually known simply as Faissal, is a Brazilian football team from the city of Itaboraí, Rio de Janeiro state, founded on January 20, 2001.

Stadium
The home stadium Alziro de Almeida has a capacity of 3,000 people.

Colors
The official colors are yellow and black.

Club kits
The home kit is a yellow and black striped jersey, black shorts and white socks. The away kit is white, with details in yellow and black, and black socks.

External links
Faissal at FFERJ

Association football clubs established in 2001
Football clubs in Rio de Janeiro (state)
2001 establishments in Brazil